Luis Ignacio Casanova Sandoval (born 1 July 1992) is a Chilean footballer who currently plays for Universidad de Chile as a centre back.

Personal life
He is the son of Luis Casanova Sr., a former professional footballer who played for clubs such as O'Higgins, Palestino and Deportes Temuco.

Career statistics

Club

International

Honours

Club
Unión Española
Primera División: 2013–T

International
Chile
Copa del Pacífico: 2012

References

External links

Football Lineups Profile

1992 births
Living people
Chilean footballers
Association football midfielders
O'Higgins F.C. footballers
Unión Española footballers
Unión La Calera footballers
San Marcos de Arica footballers
Deportes Temuco footballers
Universidad de Chile footballers
Chilean Primera División players
People from Rancagua